Theodor Aman (20 March 1831 – 19 August 1891) was a Romanian painter, engraver and art professor. He mostly produced genre and history scenes.

Biography 
His father was a cavalry commander from Craiova but he was born in Câmpulung, where his family had fled to escape the plague. In 1850, he went to Paris, where he studied briefly with Michel Martin Drolling then, after Drolling's death, with François-Édouard Picot. While there, he became part of the Romanian revolutionary circles. In 1853 he has his first display at the Salon in Paris, showing his Autoportrait. While in Paris, he became friends with other like-minded artists and Romanian revolutionaries such as Nicolae Bălcescu, and the writers Dimitrie Bolintineanu, and Cezar Bolliac. In this environment, influenced by revolutionary ideas, Aman completed the historical themed painting “Mihai VIteazul’s First Night”, which was inspired by the writings of Bolintineanu.

As a result of his strong patriotic sentiments, he participated in the Romanian Revolution of 1848 along with Ioan Maiorescu, Eugeniu Carada, and other revolutionaries.

After that, he went to Istanbul in an effort to sell some paintings to the Sultan and visited Sevastopol during the Crimean War, creating history paintings with themes related to Romania's nationalist aspirations. In 1855, he presented one of his best-known works, depicting the Battle of Alma, at the Exposition Universelle.

He returned to Romania in 1857, settling in Bucharest where he starts the foundation of his school the Bucharest National University of Arts.

When he returned home, he was knighted by Prince Barbu Dimitrie Știrbei and presented with a scholarship to continue his studies in Paris, where he came under the influence of the Barbizon school. After a brief stay in Rome, he returned to Bucharest.

In 1864, he and Gheorghe Tattarescu convinced Romania's ruler, Alexandru Ioan Cuza, to establish the "National School of Fine Arts" (now known as the Bucharest National University of Arts). Aman was appointed its first Director and held that position until his death.

Theodor Aman remained headmaster of the school until his death. In 1889 and 1890 he displayed his work in exhibits at the New Museum. At this point in his career he chose to focus on painting still life, and small portraits.

He died on 19 August 1891 due to a prostate infection.

In 1908 his Bucharest his home and workshop was converted into the Theodor Aman Museum in dedication to his life and works. The museum is one of the oldest memorial museums in Romania and houses a large number of Aman paintings. The exhibit ”Theodor Aman — painter and engraver” was inaugurated on March 24, 2011, at the Controceni National Museum. The exhibit  ”The mysteries of Theodor Aman’s painting,” was inaugurated at the Theodor Aman Museum on December 23, 2014.

In 2014, to celebrate the 150th anniversary of the school's founding, Poșta Română issued a commemorative stamp with Aman's likeness.

Selected paintings

References

Further reading 
Vasile Florea and Călin Dan, Th.Aman, Ministry of Culture, 1984
Teodor Simionescu and Adriana Gănescu, Theodor Aman 1831–1891, museum catalog, Fondul Plastic Arts, 1971
B. Mosescu-Maciuca, Theodor Aman, Meridians, 1962
Radu Bogdan, Theodor Aman, Editura de Stat Pentru Literaturǎ şi Artǎ, 1955
 Theodor Aman 1831–1891, Rumanian Institute for Cultural Relations with Foreign Countries, 1954

External links 

 Aman, între conștiința istorică și hedonism (Between Historical Consciousness and Hedonism) by Adrian Silvan Ionescu from Ziarul de Duminică, 6 April 2011
 Muzeul Theodor Aman @ Muzeul Municipiului București

1831 births
1891 deaths
People from Câmpulung
Romanian people of Armenian descent
Carol I National College alumni
19th-century Romanian painters
Romanian graphic designers
Romanian printmakers
Members of the Romanian Academy elected posthumously
Burials at Bellu Cemetery